The Winning Wallop is a 1926 American silent comedy-drama film directed by Charles Hutchison and starring William Fairbanks, Shirley Palmer and Charles K. French.

Cast
 William Fairbanks as Rex Barton 
 Shirley Palmer as Marion Wayne 
 Charles K. French as Peter Wayne 
 Melbourne MacDowell as Cyrus Barton 
 Crauford Kent as Lawrence Duncan 
 Jimmy Aubrey as Fight Manager 
 Frank Hagney as 'Pug' Brennan

References

Bibliography
 Munden, Kenneth White. The American Film Institute Catalog of Motion Pictures Produced in the United States, Part 1. University of California Press, 1997.

External links

1926 films
1920s sports comedy-drama films
American boxing films
American sports comedy-drama films
Films directed by Charles Hutchison
American silent feature films
American black-and-white films
Films produced by Samuel Sax
Gotham Pictures films
1920s English-language films
1920s American films
Silent American comedy-drama films